Taccone is an Italian surname. Notable people with the surname include:

Asa Taccone (born 1983), American musician
Innocenzio Taccone (17th century), Italian baroque painter
Jorma Taccone (born 1977), American actor, comedian, musician, and writer
Luciano Taccone (born 1989), Argentine Olympic triathlete
Tony Taccone (born 1951), American theatre director
Vito Taccone (1940–2007), Italian cyclist
 Fredric Taccone (born 1955) American Electronics Manufacturer

See also
Monte Taccone, Italian mountain
 

Italian-language surnames